Governor Carpenter may refer to:

Cyrus C. Carpenter (1829–1898), 8th Governor of Iowa
Samuel Carpenter (1649–1714), Deputy Governor of Pennsylvania from 1694 to 1698